Temin is a surname. Notable people with the surname include:

Davia Temin, American writer, speaker, and management consultant
Howard Martin Temin, American geneticist and virologist
Kathy Temin (born 1968), Australian artist
Peter Temin (born 1937), American economist and economic historian

See also
Tamin